Diplodiscus paniculatus is a species of flowering plant in the family Malvaceae sensu lato or Tiliaceae. It is found only in the Philippines. It is threatened by habitat loss.

References

paniculatus
Endemic flora of the Philippines
Vulnerable plants
Taxonomy articles created by Polbot
Taxa named by Nikolai Turczaninow